"Slave to the Habit" is a song recorded by American country music artist Shane Minor. It was his debut single and was released in March 1999 as the first single from the album Shane Minor. The song reached number 20 on the Billboard Hot Country Singles & Tracks chart and peaked at number 8 on the RPM Country Tracks chart in Canada. It was written by Toby Keith, Chuck Cannon, and Kostas.

Music video
The music video was directed by Steven Goldmann and premiered in March 1999.

Chart performance

Year-end charts

References

1999 debut singles
1999 songs
Shane Minor songs
Songs written by Chuck Cannon
Songs written by Toby Keith
Songs written by Kostas (songwriter)
Song recordings produced by Dann Huff
Mercury Records singles
Music videos directed by Steven Goldmann